Michèle Gurdal (born 30 November 1952) is a Belgian professional tennis player who was most prominent in the 1970s.  She represented Belgium in the Federation Cup every year between 1972 and 1980. Gurdal won one singles title on the WTA Tour, the 1976 Swiss Open.

Career finals

Singles (1 title)

References

External links
 
 
 

1952 births
Belgian female tennis players
Living people
20th-century Belgian women